Bamun Sualkuchi is a census town in Kamrup district in the state of Assam, India.

Demographics
 India census, Bamun Sualkuchi had a population of 7123. Males constitute 49% of the population and females 51%. Bamun Sualkuchi has an average literacy rate of 74%, higher than the national average of 59.5%; with 54% of the males and 46% of females literate. 10% of the population is under 6 years of age.

References

Cities and towns in Kamrup district